Muhammad Zaid Alam (Urdu محمد زید عالم born 24 December 1999) is a Pakistani cricketer. He made his List A debut for Lahore Whites in the 2018–19 Quaid-e-Azam One Day Cup on 13 September 2018. Prior to his List A debut, he was named in Pakistan's squad for the 2018 Under-19 Cricket World Cup.

He made his Twenty20 debut for Lahore Blues in the 2018–19 National T20 Cup on 10 December 2018.

References

External links
 

1999 births
Living people
Pakistani cricketers
Lahore Blues cricketers
Lahore Whites cricketers
Cricketers from Lahore